Sati Savitri may refer to:

 Sati Savitri (1932 film), a 1932 Hindi film
 Sati Savitri (1933 film), a Telugu mythological film
 Sati Savitri (1957 film), a Telugu mythological film
 Sati Savitri (1978 film), a Telugu mythological film
 Sathi Savithri, a 1965 Indian Kannada film

See also
 Savitri and Satyavan, a story in the Mahabharata